Chiswick Lifeboat Station is a lifeboat station on the north bank of the River Thames at Corney Reach, Chiswick, in west London. It is one of the newest stations operated by the Royal National Lifeboat Institution (RNLI), and one of the first to cover a river rather than estuarial waters or the sea.

Establishment
The inquiry set up after the collision in 1989 between the Marchioness and the dredger Bowbelle, that resulted in the loss of 51 lives, recommended a dedicated search and rescue presence on the Thames. As a part of this, the government approached the RNLI, who agreed to provide a rescue service that covered the tidal Thames between Teddington and the Channel. Locations were approved for stations at Teddington, Chiswick, Tower and Gravesend. These all became operational at the beginning of 2002.

History
Chiswick Lifeboat Station commenced service on 2 January 2002, and operated with an E-class Tiger Marine fast response boat. In July 2002 the boat was named Chelsea Pensioner at a ceremony held at the Royal Hospital Chelsea. 

Demand for the services of the Thames lifeboats proved to be much higher than originally anticipated. In 2002, their first year of operation, London lifeboats were called out over 800 times, accounting for 10% of the total number of call-outs, or "shouts", that the RNLI responded to nationwide. Within two months of opening, Chiswick became, and continued to be, the UK's second busiest lifeboat station after Tower in Central London. Between 2002 and mid-2018, Chiswick was called to 3,387 incidents and rescued more than 1,620 people.

In May 2012 a new lifeboat, an E-class lifeboat Mark II named Dougie and Donna B, was also put on service. By 2020 Chiswick was served by three boats; the Chelsea Pensioner,  the Dougie and Donna B and the Joan and Kenneth Bellamy.

Crew
The Chiswick station is manned continuously to provide an immediate response and is coordinated by the Coastguard. The crew is drawn from both full-time staff and a pool of about 50 volunteers.

Boats
Chiswick Lifeboat Station operates three boats.

See also
 Royal National Lifeboat Institution
 List of RNLI stations

References

External links
 The official page of the Chiswick lifeboat at the RNLI website

London River Services
Infrastructure in London
Piers in London
2002 establishments in England
Lifeboat stations in London
Chiswick
Transport in the London Borough of Hounslow